Eero Aleksander Nelimarkka (10 October 1891 – 27 January 1977) was a Finnish painter. He is best known for depicting the flat landscapes of Ostrobothnia known as lakeus but he also produced portraits of notable Finns and family members.

Biography
Eero Nelimarkka was born in Finland on 10 October 1891 at Vaasa, the son of Erkki Nelimarkka, a tailor, and Maria Nelimarkka (née Koivukangas). In 1912 Nelimarkka studied at Académie de la Grande Chaumière and in Académie Julian.

In 1945 professor and artist Nelimarkka established "The Nelimarkka Foundation". The founders also included J. A. Hollo. The mission of the Nelimarkka Foundation is to preserve and promote Eero Nelimarkka's production and life's work. In 1964 he built the Nelimarkka Museum on his father's farm at Alajärvi in southern Ostrobothnia. Its core collection of some 1700 works is owned by the Nelimarkka Foundation.

He is buried in the Hietaniemi Cemetery in Helsinki.

Personal life 
Nelimarkka's son Antti Nelimarkka founded Neles. Antti Nelimarkka's daughter is artist Riitta Nelimarkka-Seeck, mother of writer Max Seeck.

References

1891 births
1977 deaths
People from Vaasa
People from Vaasa Province (Grand Duchy of Finland)
Modern painters
Finnish painters
Aalto University alumni
Pro Finlandia Medals of the Order of the Lion of Finland
Alumni of the Académie de la Grande Chaumière
Académie Julian alumni
Burials at Hietaniemi Cemetery